Lemuel Cushing (1842 – March 1, 1881) was a lawyer and politician in Quebec. He represented Argenteuil in the House of Commons of Canada from 1874 to 1875 as a Liberal member.

He was born in Chatham, Canada East, the son of Lemuel Cushing and Catherine Hutchins, was educated at McGill University and was called to the Lower Canada bar in 1865. He practised law in Montreal. In 1869, Cushing married Ellen Myra Macdougall. He was president of the Montreal Y.M.C.A. from 1869 to 1870. Cushing was defeated by John Abbott in the 1874 federal election. After Abbott was unseated after an appeal, Cushing won the subsequent by-election in October 1874. The results of the by-election were declared void after an appeal and Thomas Christie was elected in December 1875.

In 1877, he published The Genealogy of the Cushing Family.

Cushing died in Montreal at the age of 39.

Electoral record 
By-election: On Mr. Abbott being unseated, on petition:

|-
  
|Liberal
|Lemuel Cushing, Jr. 
|align="right"|840 || 53.30
 
|Unknown
|William Owens
|align="right"|736   ||46.70

References 

1842 births
1881 deaths
Members of the House of Commons of Canada from Quebec
Liberal Party of Canada MPs
McGill University alumni
Anglophone Quebec people
Canadian people of American descent